Samuel Blackburn (1813–1856) was an early 19th century Scottish portrait painter.

In 1844 he is listed as a "historical and portrait painter" living at 7 London Street in Edinburgh's New Town.

In later life he was based at a luxurious house at 29 Drummond Place in Edinburgh's New Town.

He is buried in Warriston Cemetery.

Known works

see

 Sir Michael Shaw Stewart, 5th Baronet at Pollok House
Thomas Guthrie at Westminster College, Cambridge
Thomas Mure of Warriston at Newhailes House
Helen Boyle wife of Thomas Mure of Warriston at Newhailes House
Sir John Maxwell

References
 

1813 births
1856 deaths
Burials at Warriston Cemetery